SCM Gloria Buzău is a professional Romanian rugby union club from Buzău, which plays, starting with 2018-2019 edition, in the CEC Bank SuperLiga, the first division of Romanian club rugby. At the end of April, Gloria Buzău announced that they will withdraw from the national competition due to financial issues caused by the Coronavirus pandemic leaving only 6 teams in the SuperLiga for the remainder of the season. But they will continue to support their U10`s and U12`s teams.

History
The team was founded in 2005 and bore the name Stejarul Buzău for most of its history. It was financed by the local authorities on a per-project basis until 2017, when the municipality created a sports club called Sport Club Municipal Gloria and took over several other sports teams in the city, including Stejarul.

Honours
Divizia Națională de Seniori:
Runners-up (1) : 2018
Third place (1) : 2017
Divizia A:
Third place (1) : 2014
Cupa României 
Winners (1): 1988 
Runners-up (1): 1990

Last squad before dissolution

 

 

 

 

 

 

note = Players in bold have played at least one match for their national team.

See also
 Rugby union in Romania

External links
 Official website
 SuperLiga Squad Details
 PlanetaOvala.ro - Romanian Rugby News

References

Sport in Buzău
Rugby clubs established in 2017
Romanian rugby union teams
2017 establishments in Romania